

Countries

Angola 
 Lobitoo - proposal 2006
 Nova Cimangola - state-owned cement company based in Luanda, associated with Scancem and Heidelberg Cement

Benin 
 Onigbolo, Porto-Novo

Burundi 
 Bugarama
 Burundi Cement Company - (BUCECO)...

Botswana 
 Gaborone - expansion 2007

Burkina Faso 
 Ouagadougou
 Ouagadougou - cement works

Cameroon 
 Douala - port - portland cement
 Yaoundé - national capital - portland cement
 Douala - cement works
 existing owned by LaFarge of France.
 Limbe
 Bélabo - concrete sleepers

Central African Republic 
 75% from Ione, Cameroon

Republic of the Congo (Congo Brazzaville) 
 Loutété - rehabilitate 2005

Democratic Republic of Congo (Congo Kinshasa) 
 Lukala

Djibouti 
 Djibouti Cement SARL under construction, other import of 150,000MTPA for local consumption

Egypt 
Egypt is one of the biggest cement producers all over the world and the leading country in the middle East,Africa, and the Arabian Region with a total production capacity of 50 million tons of cement.
 Italcementi Group, Cairo; 5 plants, 3 business units; Suez Cement Plant,Qattamya Cement Plant, Tourah Cement Plant, Helwan Cement Plant, and the white Plant on Al Minya.

 Egyptian Cement Company recently became Lafarge Cement Egypt with a total production capacity of about 10 million tons of cement coming from five lines designed and manufactured by POLYSIUS FRANCE, LCE arranged as the second plant all over the world on the cement production.
 Sinai White Cement Portland.
 Misr-Beni Suef.
 Misr-Quena.
 CEMEX (Assiut Cement Company) .
 El Ammriya Cement Company.
 Titan Cement Company with two plants, one located in Alexandria and another in Beni-Suef.
 Al Arabia for cement.
 Al Sweedy for Cement.
 South-Valley for Cement.
 The National Cement Company.
 Arabian Cement Company.

Eritrea 
 Massawa – port and railhead – under construction

Ethiopia
Ethiopia has 20 cement factories which produce mainly OPC and PPC cement. Two other cement factories are in the pipeline. As of 2017, production capacity in Ethiopian, according to the Ethiopian Reporter, has increased to 15 million tonnes per year, but local consumption is only 6 million tonnes per year.

Equatorial Guinea 
 Malabo - Cement Works COMERCIAL OKOMAR, S.A.

Gabon 
 Ntoum - Integrated
 Owendo - Grinding
 Franceville - Grinding
Owendo - CIMAF

Ghana 
 Ghana Cement 97% market share
 Diamond Cement Ghana - 2001; railway siding Diamond Cement Ghana at Aflao near Lomé
 Buipe proposed
 Ghacem, a subsidiary of Scancem and Heidelberg Cement, with operations in the port city of Tema
"Ghacem" is same as "Ghana Cement", and does not have 97% market share anymore because Buipe plant has been built,
and is not really a subsidiary of Scancem, because Scancem is owned by Heidelberg Cement, and has two plants in Ghana :
one in Tema, which was upgraded in November 2012 from 1.2 million tons per year to 2.2 Mton/year, and one in Sekondi-Takoradi which can produce 1.2 Mton/year.

Guinea 
 Onigbolo Cement Company
 CIMAF Cement Works, Conakry
 Diamond Cement Guinea S.A [(Kagbelen)]

Ivory Coast 
 Abidjan A
 Abidjan - cement works
 San Pédro

Kenya 
 Athi River Mining, Nairobi
 Lafarge Bamburi Cement of Mombasa and Nairobi
 Marich - proposed 2009
 South Africa Portland Cement
 East African Portland Cement Co. Ltd
 National cement co. Ltd
 Mombasa Cement Ltd (MCL)
 Savanna cement co.ltd
 Simba cement co.ltd
 Rhino cement co. ltd

Liberia 
 Monrovia

Libya 
 Arabian Cement Co.
 Libyan Cement Company
 Khoms - concrete sleeper plant by Walterbau, Germany.

Malawi
 LaFarge Portland Malawi, Blantyre
 Shayona Cement Corporation Limited, Kasungu
 Cement Products Limited, Mangochi

Mali 
 Diamond Cements .S.A.Bamako

Mauritania 
 Nouakchott - CIMENT DE MAURITANIE
 Nouakchott - MAFCI

Mauritius 
 Port Louis, Mauritius - import

Morocco 
 Total production capacity is 19 million tons in 2017.

Casablanca-Settat region 
 Casablanca (LafargeHolcim) 
 Settat (LafargeHolcim)
 Jorf Lasfar (Ciments du Maroc)
 Ben Ahmed (CIMAT)

Tanger-Tetouan-Al Hoceima region 
 Tangiers (LafargeHolcim)
 Tetouan (LafargeHolcim)

Fès-Meknès region 
 Fez (LafargeHolcim)
 Meknes (LafargeHolcim)

Marrakesh-Safi region 
 Marrakesh (Ciments du Maroc)
 Safi (Ciments du Maroc)

Oriental region 
 Oujda (LafargeHolcim)
 Nador (LafargeHolcim)

Béni Mellal-Khénifra region 
 Beni Mellal (CIMAT)

Souss-Massa region 
 Ait Baha (Ciments du Maroc)

Laâyoune-Sakia El Hamra region 
 Laayoune (Ciments du Maroc)

Rabat-Salé-Kénitra region 
 Temara (Votorantim Cimentos)

Mozambique 
 Cimentos de Mozambique, subsidiary of Portuguese company Cimpor at Matola
 Dondo - also concrete sleeper plant
 Nacala Sunera Cimentos

Namibia 
 Karibib - proposed 2008
 Otavi - Ohorongo Cement, under construction 2010;  rail siding

Niger 
 Niamey - SNC - SOCIÉTÉ NIGÉRIENNE DE CIMENTERIE

Nigeria 
 Bauchi-Gwana Cement, Alkaeri L.G.A. Bauchi (subsidiary of Cretent Intl)
 BUA Cement, Obu, Okpella, Edo State Former Edo cement, near Benin City
BUA Cement, Kalambaina Sokoto State. Commissioned July 2018
 Cement Company of Northern Nigeria, also known as Sokoto Cement, with 6 offices in northern states
 Dangote Cement
 Benue Cement Company (now under Dangote group)
 Obajana cement factory (Dangote group), Obajana, Kogi State
 Obajana cement factory (Dangote group), Ibeshe, Ogun state
 Lafarge
 Ashaka Cement in Bauchi State in the north
 Atlas Cement
 Lakatabu cement factory (WAPCO Lafarge), Ifo, OGUN STATE
 WAPCO in Lagos State
 Nigerian Cement

Rwanda 
 Rwanda Cement Factory (CIMERWA)

Senegal 
 Societe Commerciale de Transport et d'Industrie (SUARL) in Dakar
 Sococim Industries, Rufisque
 Ciments du Sahel, Polysius AG subsidiary, Kirène - to be expanded in 2008
 Dangote Cement

Sierra Leone 
 Freetown

South Africa 
 Pretoria Portland Cement Company
- Hercules (Pretoria)
- Jupiter (Johannesburg)
- Dwaalboom
- Slurry
- De Hoek
- Riebeeck West
- Port Elizabeth
- Saldanha (Slag Grinding Only)
Sephaku Cement
- Aganang (Lichtenburg)
- Delmas (Grinding Station)
 Lafarge Cement
- Lichtenburg
- Randfontein (Grinding Station)
- Richards Bay (Grinding Station)
 AfriSam
- Dudfield (Lichtenburg)
- Ulco (Kimberly)
- Roodepoort (Grinding Station)
- Vanderbijlpark (Slag Grinding & Blending Station) 
- Brakpan (Blending Station)
 NPC Cimpor
- Simuma
- Coedmore
- Newcastle (Slag grinding and cement blending plant)

Sudan 
 Aslan Cement Factory - rail junction - river in Khartoum Region
 Rabak - rail junction - river
 Atbara - rail junction - river in atbara Region
 Proposed 2008

Tanzania 
 Mbeya Cement in Mbeya
 Tanga Cement in Tanga
 Twiga Cement in Dar es Salaam
 Athi River Mining in Dar es Salaam & Tanga
 Nyati Cement in Dar es Salaam
 KIlwa Cement in Lindi
 Kisarawe Cement in Dar Es Salaam
 Camel Cement in Dar es Salaam
 Kilimanjaro Cement in Moshi
 Dangote Industries Tanzania in Mtwara

Togo 
 Cimtogo, Lomé
 WACEM, Lomé
 Tabligbo - CIMAO clinker works (proposed)

Tunisia 
 Benzert privatized in 1997
 La société des Ciments Artificiels Tunisiens « CAT » part of Italian group «COLACEM », based in Tunis
 La société des Ciments de Jbel Oust « CJO » from the Brazilian group « Votorantim Cimentos », based in Jbel Oust 
 La société des Ciments d'Enfidha « CE » from the Spanish group « UNILAND », based in Enfidha
 La société des Ciments de Gabès « SCG » from the Portuguese group «SECIL », based in Gabès
 Carthage Cement built in 2013 by FL Smith with capacity of 6500TPD based in EL Mourouj
 La SOTACIB, White cement production plant, from the Spanish group « PRASA », based in Tunis

Uganda 
 Moroto Cement Limited at Moroto, in Moroto District (32% marketshare)
 Tororo Cement Limited at Tororo, in Tororo District (34% marketshare)
 Hima Cement Limited at Hima, in Kasese District (29% marketshare)
 Kampala Cement Company Limited at Namataba, Mukono District 5%

Zambia 
 Lafarge Cement Zambia in Chilanga, Ndola
 AMAKA Cement (https://web.archive.org/web/20131016092659/http://www.scirocco.com.zm/)
 Zambezi Portland Cement (Ndola)
 Dangote (Ndola) (New Entrant into Zambian market, Breaking ground in 2012 with expected production start up in 2015)

Zimbabwe 
 Lafarge Cement Zimbabwe, formerly Circle Cement, Harare
 Unicem, fully owned by PPC Cement
 Harare
 Bulawayo
 Colleen Bawn
 Sino Zimbabwe Cement Company, Gweru
 Live Touch Cement Company, Redcliff
 Pacstar Cement Company, Redcliff

See also 
 Portland cement
 Concrete sleeper
 Cement mill
 Cement kiln
 List of countries by cement production

External links 
 Cement and Concrete Institute
 Cement Industry Net

References 

Economy of Africa-related lists
Cement
Africa